Kfar HaNoar HaDati (lit. The Religious Youth Village) is a youth village in northern Israel. Adjacent to Kfar Hassidim, it falls under the jurisdiction of Zevulun Regional Council.

History
The school was founded in 1936 and today teaches around 350 students from seventh to twelfth grade, most of whom are new immigrants from Ethiopia who arrive at the school with the help of Youth Aliyah.

References 

Youth villages in Israel
Populated places established in 1936
1936 establishments in Mandatory Palestine
Populated places in Haifa District
Ethiopian-Jewish culture in Israel